GRB 051221A was a gamma ray burst (GRB) that was detected by NASA's Swift Gamma-Ray Burst Mission on December 21, 2005. A gamma-ray burst is a highly luminous flash of gamma rays, the most energetic form of electromagnetic radiation.  The coordinates of the burst were α=, δ=, and it lasted about 1.4 seconds. The same satellite discovered X-ray emission from the same object, and
the GMOS Instrument on the Gemini Observatory discovered an afterglow in the visible spectrum. This was observed for the next ten days, allowing a redshift of Z = 0.5464 to be determined for the host galaxy.

The gamma ray emission from this object is of the variety known as a short-hard burst. The energy emission is consistent with the model of a merger by compact objects. It was the most distant short-hard burst found to that date for which a redshift could be determined. The X-ray light curve showed evidence of three distinct breaks, possibly representing a strong energy injection. The energy may have been injected by a millisecond magnetar. That is, a rapidly rotating pulsar with a strong magnetic field, estimated at 1014 gauss (1010 teslas).

References

051221A
Magnetars
20051221
December 2005 events